The  is a Japanese symbol in the form of a small hiragana or katakana tsu. It serves multiple purposes in Japanese writing.

Appearance 
In both hiragana and katakana, the sokuon appears as a tsu reduced in size:

Use in Japanese
The main use of the sokuon is to mark a geminate consonant, which is represented in most romanization systems by the doubling of the consonant, except that Hepburn romanization writes a geminate ch as tch. It denotes the gemination of the initial consonant of the symbol that follows it.

Examples:

The sokuon never appears at the beginning of a word or before a vowel (a, i, u, e, or o), and rarely appears before a syllable that begins with the consonants n, m, r, w, or y. (In words and loanwords that require geminating these consonants,  n,  mu,  ru,  u, and  i are usually used, respectively, instead of the sokuon.) In addition, it does not appear before voiced consonants (g, z, d, or b), or before h, except in loanwords, or distorted speech, or dialects.

The sokuon is also used at the end of a sentence, to indicate a glottal stop (IPA , a sharp or cut-off articulation), which may indicate angry or surprised speech. This pronunciation is also used for exceptions mentioned before (e.g. a sokuon before a vowel kana). There is no standard way of romanizing the sokuon that is at the end of a sentence. In English writing, this is often rendered as an em dash. Other conventions are to render it as t or as an apostrophe.

In the International Phonetic Alphabet, the sokuon is transcribed with either a colon-like length mark or a doubled consonant:

 kite (来て, "come") – 
 kitte (切手, "postage stamp") –  
 asari (あさり, "clams") – 
 assari (あっさり, "easily") – 

The sokuon represents a mora, thus for example the word Nippon (Japan) consists of only two syllables, but four morae: ni-p-po-n.

Use in other languages 

In addition to Japanese, sokuon is used in Okinawan katakana orthographies. Ainu katakana uses a small ッ both for a final t-sound and to represent a sokuon (there is no ambiguity however, as gemination is allophonic with syllable-final t).

Computer input 

There are several methods of entering the sokuon using a computer or word-processor, such as xtu, ltu, ltsu, etc. Some systems, such as Kotoeri for macOS and the Microsoft IME, generate a sokuon if an applicable consonant letter is typed twice; for example tta generates った.

Other representations 

Braille:

 Computer encodings

References

See also
Japanese phonology gives a detailed description of the sound system of Japanese.
Gemination

External links

Kana
Japanese phonology
Japanese writing system terms